Santiago Peak is the southern mountain of the Saddleback landform in Orange County, California. It is the highest and most prominent peak of both the Santa Ana Mountains and Orange County; it also marks a border point with Riverside County. The peak is named for Santiago Creek, which begins on its southwestern slope. During most winters, snow falls at least once on the peak. A telecommunication antenna farm with microwave antennas sits atop the peak. 

The Acjachemen referred to the peak as Kalawpa, with the nearby village of Alume meaning "to raise the head in looking upward," in reference to the mountain.

Hiking

More than one trail leads to the top of Santiago Peak, but the most popular among hikers is the Holy Jim trail. It is a moderate to strenuous hike and is most enjoyable during spring and winter due to the large number of insects during warmer times of the year.

From the summit of Santiago Peak, one can see the larger Southern California peaks like San Gorgonio Mountain, San Jacinto Peak, and Mount San Antonio.  However, due to the large number of antennas at the top of Santiago Peak, a full 360-degree view of the surrounding landscapes is not possible.  Those at the top must walk approximately a quarter-mile around the perimeter of all the antennas to take in views of every direction.

Radio communication facilities 
Santiago Peak is a radio site with buildings owned by American Tower, Crown Castle, MobileRelay Associates, Day Wireless, Orange County Communications, the United States Federal Government, the State of California, and Southern California Edison, among others.

Santiago Peak provides radio coverage over much of Los Angeles, Orange, San Bernardino, Riverside, and San Diego counties. It houses both broadcast and two-way communications facilities on virtually every frequency band, including FM broadcast, VHF low- and high-band, UHF, 800/900 MHz, and microwave.

Gallery

See also
 List of highest points in California by county

References

External links 
 

Mountains of Orange County, California
Mountains of Riverside County, California
Santa Ana Mountains
Cleveland National Forest
Mountains of Southern California